Dione juno, the Juno silverspot, juno longwing, or Juno heliconian, is a species of butterfly of the subfamily Heliconiinae in the family Nymphalidae found from southern United States to South America.

Subspecies
Listed alphabetically:
D. j. andicola (Bates, 1864)
D. j. huascuma (Reakirt, 1866)
D. j. juno (Cramer, [1779])
D. j. miraculosa Hering, 1926
D. j. suffumata Brown & Mielke, 1972

References

Butterflies described in 1779
Heliconiini
Nymphalidae of South America